"Easy Street" is a jazz standard and popular song with lyrics and music written by Alan Rankin Jones in 1940. It was first recorded by 'Jimmy Lunceford and his Orchestra.'

Background
The term 'easy street' originated in the late 1800s and is slang for "a state in which everything is going well and one is comfortable.” It's usually meant momentarily.

Musical characteristics
Easy Street is in thirty-two bar form and includes a melody that moves the title line to different pitches whenever it recurs in a phrase. The song is usually played with a slow, slightly swinging melody.

References 

Jazz standards
1940 songs